Resurgence was a professional wrestling pay-per-view (PPV) event produced by New Japan Pro-Wrestling (NJPW). It was held on August 14, 2021, at The Torch at LA Coliseum in Los Angeles, California. Wrestlers from U.S. partner promotions All Elite Wrestling (AEW), Impact Wrestling, Major League Wrestling (MLW), the United Wrestling Network's Championship Wrestling from Hollywood (CWFH), and Ring of Honor (ROH)  appeared on the card.

In the main event, Hiroshi Tanahashi defeated Lance Archer to win the IWGP United States Heavyweight Championship. In other prominent matches, Jay White defeated David Finlay to retain the NEVER Openweight Championship, The Good Brothers (Doc Gallows and Karl Anderson) defeated Jon Moxley and Yuji Nagata, and Tomohiro Ishii defeated Moose. 

Former IWGP World Heavyweight Champion Will Ospreay made an unannounced surprise appearance at the event announcing himself to be medically cleared to complete and yet out of the G1 Climax, calling current IWGP World Heavyweight Champion Shingo Takagi an “interim” champion and revealing a separate identical IWGP World Heavyweight Championship belt. He also announced himself to not be returning to Japan and instead said he would be competing on New Japan's American based show NJPW Strong.

Production

Background
In October 2019, NJPW announced their expansion into the United States with their new American division, New Japan Pro-Wrestling of America. In June 2021, NJPW announced Resurgence would take place on August 14 of that year, at The Torch at LA Coliseum in Los Angeles, California, a concert theater located within the Los Angeles Memorial Coliseum. This event will mark the first NJPW has held in the United States with fans in attendance since February 2020, due to restrictions imposed by the COVID-19 pandemic.

Storylines
Resurgence featured professional wrestling matches that involve different wrestlers from pre-existing scripted feuds and storylines. Wrestlers portrayed villains, heroes, or less distinguishable characters in the scripted events that built tension and culminated in a wrestling match or series of matches.

LA Dojo Young Lion Alex Couglin had been challenging many competitors from NJPW and other promotions for a number of weeks, including the likes of Rocky Romero and Josh Alexander on New Japan's American based show, NJPW Strong. It was announced that at Resurgence, he would challenge fellow LA Dojo student Karl Fredericks.

Following weeks of attacks on himself and most of the AEW and Impact Wrestling roster, Jon Moxley would challenge The Good Brothers to a tag team match and would claim to have a mystery partner to tag with at the event.

NEVER Openweight Champion Jay White would suffer a quarter final loss against David Finlay in the New Japan Cup in March. After the win, Finlay was granted a future shot at the NEVER Openweight Championship. After White debuted at Impact Wrestling's Slammiversary, there were weeks of assaults between the two on Impact. The match for the title was announced shortly after the events original announcement.

At night 2 of AEW's Fyter Fest, Hiroshi Tanahashi appeared on a vignette challenging the winner of the later IWGP US Heavyweight Championship match to a future championship match. After Lance Archer beat then champion Jon Moxley at the event, a match between Tanahashi and Archer was made at Resurgence.

Results

Notes

References

2021 in professional wrestling
2021 in California
Events in Los Angeles
June 2021 events in the United States
Professional wrestling in Los Angeles